Maimun Najar was a rabbi at Constantine, Algeria, in the first half of the 15th century.

Life and work 
Like his contemporaries and countrymen Isaac ben Sheshet and Simon ben Ẓemaḥ Duran, he left Spain in consequence of the persecutions and fled (1395) to Algeria. In his responsa Tashbaẓ (part i., No. 86, Amsterdam, 1738) Duran calls Najar "Maimun ben David", but David Conforte, in Ḳore ha-Dorot, p. 26b, designates him as "Maimun ben Saadia." Najar's correspondence with Duran on religious questions is found in Tashbaẓ (part i., Nos. 94-96, 131-134, 154-157; part ii., Nos. 4, 68-73, 86, 89, 135, 164-168).

Jewish Encyclopedia bibliography 
Azulai, Shem ha-Gedolim, i. 88, No. 39, Warsaw, 1876;
Julius Fürst, Bibl. Jud. iii. 12.

External links
Jewish Encyclopedia article on NAJARA

Year of birth missing
Year of death missing
Spanish refugees
Jewish refugees
Medieval Majorcan Jews
15th-century Algerian rabbis
People from Constantine, Algeria